The East Sussex County Council election, 2013 took place on 2 May 2013 as part of the 2013 United Kingdom local elections. All 49 councillors of East Sussex County Council were elected from 44 electoral divisions, which return either one or two councillors each by first-past-the-post voting for a four-year term of office. The electoral divisions were the same as those used at the previous election in 2009. No elections were held in Brighton and Hove, which is a unitary authority outside the area covered by the County Council.

All locally registered electors (British, Irish, Commonwealth and European Union citizens) who were aged 18 or over on Thursday 2 May 2013 were entitled to vote in the local elections. Those who were temporarily away from their ordinary address (for example, away working, on holiday, in student accommodation or in hospital) were also entitled to vote in the local elections, although those who had moved abroad and registered as overseas electors cannot vote in the local elections. It is possible to register to vote at more than one address (such as a university student who had a term-time address and lives at home during holidays) at the discretion of the local Electoral Register Office, but it remains an offence to vote more than once in the same local government election.

Summary
At this election, the Conservative Party was seeking to retain overall control of the council, previously having a majority of four seats, and the Liberal Democrats to maintain or better their position of 13 seats.

The Conservatives were reduced to 20 seats on the 49-member council, producing no overall control. UKIP made strong gains, winning 7 seats (their first ever seats on the council), and Labour also gained seats (its gain of three seats being wholly at the expense of Conservatives).  The number of Independent members increased to 5.  Overall, the Liberal Democrats lost three councillors.

Since the election the Conservatives have decided to form a minority administration.

Election results

|}

Results by electoral division
East Sussex includes five districts: Eastbourne borough, Hastings borough, Lewes district, Rother district and Wealden district, and the results are grouped by those districts.

Eastbourne

Hastings

Lewes

Rother

Wealden

References

External links
East Sussex County Council

2013
2013 English local elections
2010s in East Sussex